The National Chung Cheng University Library is an academic library in Minxiong Township, Chiayi County, Taiwan as part of National Chung Cheng University.

History
The library was established in 1989. In 1993, it moved to its current building.

Architecture
The library building consists of 8 floors and one basement. It has arts exhibition area, audio and video resource center, circulation desk, comic books area, computer area, dining area, garden, information reception, learning and discussion space, lecture room, multimedia workroom, newspaper area, reading room, reference book area, reference services, self-service book check out and return, study hall etc.

See also
 Education in Taiwan

References

External links

 

1989 establishments in Taiwan
Academic libraries in Taiwan
Buildings and structures in Chiayi County
Libraries established in 1989